Max Cullen Macon  (October 14, 1915 – August 5, 1989) was an American Major League Baseball player, a minor league player-manager and pitching coach, and a professional baseball scout. His professional playing career lasted for 19 seasons between 1934 and 1955.

Career
Macon was primarily a pitcher but also played first base and the outfield during his MLB career, which spanned 1938–1947. Of his 226 total big-league games played, he was a pitcher in 81 games (29 as a starter), a first baseman in 75, and an outfielder in 23. He was a pinch hitter or pinch runner in the balance of his appearances.

Macon's most extensive playing time was with the  Boston Braves, when he got into 106 games (only one as a pitcher), hit all three of his MLB home runs and collected 36 of his 46 career runs batted in. He missed the 1945 season while serving in the United States Army during World War II; during his service, Macon was hospitalized for 29 days after being injured in a dynamite explosion at Fort McClellan in Alabama. He was out of baseball in 1946, then returned to Boston to finish his major league career in 1947.

As a pitcher, Macon posted a career 17–19 won–lost mark and a 4.24 earned run average, with nine complete games, two shutouts, and three saves; in 297 innings pitched, he permitted 307 hits and 128 bases on balls, while registering 90 strikeouts. On offense, Macon collected 133 hits, which included 17 doubles and four triples, along with his three homers. He batted .265.

Starting in 1949, Macon managed in the minor leagues for 12 seasons, including six years at the Triple-A level in the Dodgers' organization. In 1961, he became a scout and minor league pitching coach for the Detroit Tigers, with whom he remained until 1968, when he was named Southeast regional scouting supervisor for the Pittsburgh Pirates. During these years, Macon supplemented his earnings as a college basketball referee, with both the SEC and MVC.

In 2001, Minor League Baseball published a list of its 100 greatest teams of all time, which included two managed by Macon: the 1951 Hazard Bombers (at number 81) and the 1952 Miami Sun Sox (at number 40).

References

Further reading

Articles

 Levy, Sam. "Sport Chatter: Max Macon's Fault". The Milwaukee Journal. Thursday, September 30, 1937. p. 8.
 Kirksey, George (UP). "Cardinals Still Stage Best Show in Camp Circuit: Prize Rookies Are Max Macon of Cards and Harry Craft of Reds". The Beaver County Times. Thursday, April 7, 1938, p. 9.
 McNeil, Marc T. "Casual Close-Ups: The Boys Are A-Feudin' in Earnest; Snyder Is Blamed; Like Father Like Son; Here's an Odd One". The Montreal Gazette. Monday, June 22, 1942. p. 16.
 French, Bob. "Mirrors of Sport: Max Macon in the News Again". The Toledo Blade. Wednesday, July 15, 1942. p. 18.
 Associated Press. "Dodgers' Mystery Has New Chapter". The Ottawa Citizen. Thursday, July 16, 1942. p. 15.
 Associated Press. "Max Macon in Line With Brooklyn Club". The Ottawa Citizen. Tuesday, March 16, 1943. p. 10.
 Moshier, Jeff. "Playing Square". The St. Petersburg Evening Independent. Friday, May 19, 1944. p. 12.
 Associated Press. "Max Macon — The Former Hurler is Doing a Fine Job at First Base for the Boston Braves". The Christian Science Monitor. Wednesday, May 24, 1944. p. 16. 
 United Press. "Max Macon Called Home From Braves". The Tuscaloosa News. Monday, April 7, 1947. p. 7.
 Thisted, Red. "Baseball Players Are an Odd Breed: Macon Plays It All the Way Out". The Milwaukee Sentinel. Sunday, January 25, 1948. p. B3
 Beck, Bill. "Time For Sports: A Pox On Max Macon's Plan Or Hooks Iott Enjoys Last Laugh". The St Petersburg Times. Thursday, June 26, 1952. p. 22.
 Associated Press. "Max Macon Appointed Montreal Manager". The Reading Eagle. Friday, November 27, 1953. p. 22.
 Holmes, Tommy (Nov 30, 1953). "Army Promises '54 Powerhouse". The Brooklyn Eagle. November 30, 1953. p. 15.
 Fitzgerald, Tommy. "Macon has the Makin's: New Montreal Pilot Destined For Bums". Baseball Digest. March 1954. pp. 83–84. 
 Associated Press. "Max Macon Receives Threatening Letter". The St. Petersburg Times. Sunday, May 23, 1954. p. 7-C
 McGowan, Lloyd. "Macon's Royals Register; Top Richmond A la Grant Amoros Hits; Virginia Reel". The Montreal Star. Wednesday, June 2, 1954. p. 36
 McGowan, Lloyd. "Black, Roebuck Shelled By Richmond Artillery; World Series Hero Hit in Start with Royals; Arm 'Fine'". The Montreal Star. Thursday, June 3, 1954. p. 36
 McGowan, Lloyd. "Lehman Lacks Usual Control As Royals Bow to Richmond". The Montreal Star. Friday, June 4, 1954. p. 22
 McGowan, Lloyd. "Bits from the Batter's Box". The Montreal Star. Saturday, June 5, 1954.
 Carroll, Dink. "Max Macon Suspended Indefinitely, Fined: Shaughnessy Tags Royals' Boss For Latest Run-In With Umpires". The Montreal Gazette. Saturday, August 7, 1954. p. 8.
 Macon, Max. "Future Stars: Fernandez a Fielding Find". The Reading Eagle. Saturday, January 22, 1955. p. 6.
 Wolfe, Don. "Mirrors of Sport: Max Macon Recalls Big Homer". The Toledo Blade. Monday, May 2, 1955. p. 18.
 "The Flying Dutchman". The Kentucky High School Athlete. March 1961. p. 4.
 Fitzgerald, Tommy. "Can't Hide Roberto" . The Miami News. Saturday, March 26, 1966. p. 1B.
 Biederman, Lester J. "Liking Pirates Contagious". The Pittsburgh Press. Friday, August 19, 1966. p. 27.
 Bloodworth, Bob. "'The Good Arms, Legs' Attract the Scouts". The Palm Beach Post. Tuesday, August 19, 1969. p. 29.
 Eck, Frank (AP). "Ex-Manager Denies He Had Orders to Hide Clemente". The Washington (PA) Observer-Reporter. Wednesday, December 15, 1971. p. D6
 Christine, Bill. "Roberto! (Part 3): Hocus-Pocus in Montreal". The Pittsburgh Post-Gazette. Wednesday, April 18, 1973. p. 33.
 Associated Press. "Max Macon Dies; Was Pitcher, Scout". The Reading Eagle. Thursday, August 10, 1989. p. 45.
 Zygner, Sam; Smith, Steve. "The Great 1952 Florida International League Pennant Race". Baseball Research Journal. Volume 43, Issue 1. Spring 2014. pp. 54–67

Books
Sutter, L.M.. "Chapter 11: The 1951 Hazard Bombers". Ball, Bat and Bitumen: A History of Coalfield Baseball in the Appalachian South. Jefferson, NC: McFarland & Company. pp. 128–135. .

External links

1915 births
1989 deaths
Baseball player-managers
Baseball players from Pensacola, Florida
Bloomington Bloomers players
Boston Braves players
Brooklyn Dodgers players
College men's basketball referees in the United States
Columbus Red Birds players
Detroit Tigers scouts
Fort Worth Cats players
Hazard Bombers players
Hutchinson Larks players
Major League Baseball first basemen
Major League Baseball outfielders
Major League Baseball pitchers
Miami Sun Sox players
Modesto Reds players
Montreal Royals managers
Montreal Royals players
New Albany High School (Indiana) alumni
New York Mets scouts
Newark Bears (IL) players
Pittsburgh Pirates scouts
Rochester Red Wings players
Sportspeople from Pensacola, Florida
St. Louis Cardinals players
St. Paul Saints (AA) managers
St. Paul Saints (AA) players
Springfield Redbirds players
United States Army personnel of World War II